Arina Rodionova and Storm Sanders were the defending champions but chose to compete at the 2022 French Open qualifying instead.

Matilde Paoletti and Lisa Pigato won the title, defeating Darya Astakhova and Daniela Vismane in the final, 6–3, 7–6(9–7).

Seeds

Draw

Draw

References
Main Draw

Trofeo BMW Cup - Doubles